Sheykh Khomat (also Romanized as Sheykh Khomāţ) is a village in Shavur Rural District, Shavur District, Shush County, Khuzestan Province, Iran. At the 2006 census, its population was 264, in 39 families.

References 

Populated places in Shush County